The men's team table tennis event was part of the table tennis programme and took place between November 29 and December 3, at the Al-Arabi Indoor Hall.

Schedule
All times are Arabia Standard Time (UTC+03:00)

Results

Preliminary round

Group A

Group B

Group C

Group D

Knockout round

Quarterfinals

Semifinals

Final

Non-participating athletes

References

 Results
 Official website

Table tennis at the 2006 Asian Games